Rokas Žilinskas (20 July 1972 – 6 June 2017) was a Lithuanian journalist and politician. He was elected to the Seimas in 2008 and was a member of the Lithuanian Parliament until his death. He was the first openly gay member of the parliament.

Biography
Rokas Žilinskas was born in a swimming coach and kindergarten teacher's family. While at school Rokas became interested in geography, later politology and politics. He studied journalism at the University of Vilnius. Before being elected to the Lithuanian Parliament Rokas Žilinskas was a famous  Lithuanian journalist, editor and TV News anchor having worked at LRT  news service from 1993 to 1998 and LNK television from 1998 to 2008.

In 2009, one year after the Parliament elections, Žilinskas openly declared that he was gay, hence becoming the first elected LGBT politician in Lithuania. He, however, expressed disapproval for the equal rights for gays, such as gay marriages and gay adoption, but unexpectedly decided to participate in the first homosexual parade in Vilnius, despite being opposed to it for a long time.

Žilinskas damaged his public image after he cursed at policemen when he was under the influence of alcohol. In 2011, Žilinskas was expelled from the Christian Party, after he was noticed allegedly being drunk in Seimas.

In 2012, he became a member of the conservative Homeland Union and was re-elected to the Seimas that year as well as in 2016.

Addiction challenges 
Active performance and openness made MP Rokas Žilinskas a special example on Lithuania's political arena. He openly talked about his addiction problems, his path to recovery, and voluntarily helped other people that had similar problems and experiences.

He worked to balance the harm of addictions and the potential of addiction-incurring businesses to level it by contributing to education, addiction prevention, treatment and rehabilitation.

Personally led his own working groups and contributed to the groups under Offices of the President and the Government of Lithuania to develop and introduce socially responsible model in relations between addiction-incurring industries and businesses and the society.

Honors and awards 

 Charity trust fund "Mūsų krantai" Golden Cross Order 3rd Class “For the Sake of Society”;
 News website DELFI’ “Titan” “For the Most Daring Article of the Year”;
 By the Decree of the President of the Republic of Lithuania – Medal of Honor “For Personal Contribution to Lithuania’s Chairmanship of European Council in 2013”.

Death
Žilinskas was hospitalized in May 2017. On 6 June 2017, Žilinskas died of pneumonia from complications of HIV at Vilnius University's Santaros Clinic at age 44. He was buried in Antakalnis Cemetery in Vilnius.

In popular culture
 Žilinskas was presented in a British documentary film Starsuckers where he was interviewed.
 Žilinskas was a subject of parody by a Lithuanian humorist Justinas Jankevičius who parodied Žilinskas's TV-announcer-like way of speaking.
Žilinskas was a subject of parody by famous Lithuanian actress Ineta Stasiulytė in the show "Pakartok". https://play.tv3.lt/pakartok-rokas-zilinskas-10170797

References

1972 births
2017 deaths
21st-century Lithuanian politicians
Gay politicians
Homeland Union politicians
Journalists from Vilnius
Members of the Seimas
Lithuanian LGBT journalists
Lithuanian LGBT politicians
LGBT legislators
Burials at Antakalnis Cemetery
Deaths from pneumonia in Lithuania